The Chery Tiggo 5x is a subcompact crossover SUV produced by the Chinese manufacturer Chery under the Tiggo crossover product series. The model also spawned an electric variant called the Chery Tiggo e, and shared the platform with the later introduced Cowin Showjet in 2019.

Overview
The Chery Tiggo 5x is the production version of the 2014 Chery Concept Beta concept car. 

The production Chery Tiggo 5x was launched on the Chinese car market in the second half of 2017, positioned between the subcompact Chery Tiggo 3x and the compact Chery Tiggo 3. Much like the marketing position of the Tiggo 3x, the Tiggo 5x is the sportier version of the Tiggo 5 despite being a completely different model. 

In China, the Tiggo 5x was sold with a lone engine option, a 1.5 liter inline-4 engine. An electric variant called the Tiggo e was also offered in China equipped with a 53.6 kWh battery and delivering a range of 401 km / 251 miles (NEDC), with the Tiggo e drivetrain producing 95 kW ( 127 hp ) of power, and 250 N.m / 184 lb.ft of torque.
The top speed of the 2019 Chery Tiggo e is 160 km/h / 100 mph, with 0 to 50km/h acceleration in 3.9 seconds.

Facelift
A facelift was launched in 2019 featuring revised front and rear end designs with the front end sharing the same family front fascia with the Chery Tiggo 8.

Another facelift was launched in 2020 featuring a further updated front fascia inline with the second generation Tiggo 7.

Markets

South America
At the end of 2018, it was launched in Brazil and South America rebadged as the Tiggo 5x and assembled in complete knock down at the CAOA factory in Anápolis. In South America, it is sold in two versions with a 1.5 Turbo 16V flex engine delivering 150 horsepower (ethanol) or 147 horsepower (petrol) combined with a 6-speed DCT automatic transmission. In some markets, the 2.0-liter naturally aspirated petrol engine with CVT transmission is also offered. In 2020, the restyling is presented, rebadged as The Tiggo 5x Pro.

Italy
In March 2020, the Italian importer DR Automobiles began to import the Tiggo 5X renamed DR 5.0 in Italy equipped with 1.5 Acteco petrol and bifuel (petrol/LPG) engine delivering 114 horses and Euro 6D-Full approved. The DR 5.0 is sold in a single set-up with standard equipment including 18” alloy wheels, two front airbags, stability and traction control and 9” touchscreen infotainment system.

In September 2022, another importer also starts to sell the vehicle in Italy. Eurasia Motors (local importer of Great Wall and Haval) launched a new brand named EMC and renamed the Tiggo 5X as EMC Wave 3. It is manufactured in Sichuan, China, and converted to LPG in Piedmont, Northern Italy.

Russia
The car was launched in Russia as the Chery Tiggo 4 in February 2019. The facelifted version entered the market soon, in August 2019. The Tiggo 4 is offered with a 1.5-liter and 2.0-liter naturally aspirated petrol engine paired with a manual transmission or CVT and with a 1.5-liter turbo petrol engine combined with a 6-speed DCT automatic transmission.

Middle-East
In 2019, Modiran Vehicle Manufacturing Company (MVM) launched this car as the MVM X55 in the Iranian market. This company also released the facelift model of this car in 2022 as the MVM X55 Pro. This car was released in the Iranian market with two trims: Excellent and Excellent Sport. X55 in Iranian market is offered with a 1.5-liter turbo petrol engine paired with a 6-speed DCT automatic transmission. but in X55 Pro, the engine combined with 9-speed CVT transmission. 

During 2021, the car was launched across the more countries of Middle-East as the Tiggo 4 Pro. It is currently available in Kuwait, Bahrain, Qatar, Saudi Arabia and UAE. The Tiggo 4 is offered with a 1.5-liter petrol engine paired with a CVT transmission on the base, comfort and luxury models and with a 1.5-liter turbo petrol engine combined with a 6-speed DCT automatic transmission on the "flagship" model.

References

External links
Official website

2010s cars
Cars introduced in 2017
Cars of China
Cars of Brazil
Tiggo 5x
Crossover sport utility vehicles
Front-wheel-drive vehicles
Mini sport utility vehicles
Production electric cars